Jerry Holland may refer to:
 Jerry Holland (musician) (1955–2009), Canadian fiddler
 Jerry Holland (rugby union) (1955–2022), Irish rugby union player and coach
 Jerry Holland (ice hockey) (born 1954), Canadian ice hockey player